Virgo is the name of several fictional characters appearing in American comic books published by Marvel Comics.

Publication history
The original Virgo first appeared in Avengers #72 (January 1970), and was created by Roy Thomas and Sal Buscema. The character subsequently appears in Avengers #120-123 (February–May 1974), Ghost Rider #7 (August 1974), Iron Man #184 (July 1984), and West Coast Avengers #26 (November 1987), in which she is killed. Virgo appeared as part of the "Zodiac" entry in the Official Handbook of the Marvel Universe Deluxe Edition #20.

Fictional character biography

Virgo (Elaine McLaughlin)

Elaine McLaughlin is a founding member of the Zodiac, and her base of operations was Denver, Colorado.  The Zodiac was infiltrated by Nick Fury, posing as Scorpio; the Zodiac fought the Avengers and escaped. Led by Taurus, the Zodiac later attempted to kill all Manhattan residents born under the sign of Gemini as a show of power, but were thwarted by the Avengers. Taurus's faction attempted to kill the Zodiac dissident faction, but all twelve leaders were captured by the Avengers. A new android version of the Zodiac later appeared, led by Scorpio in a new android body, massacred the human Zodiac, and took over their criminal operations.

Virgo (LMD)

An android Virgo was a Life Model Decoy created by Scorpio (Jacob Fury) in his "Theatre Of Genetics" to be part of his Zodiac crime organization. The Capricorn and Pisces androids, however, died due to imperfections soon after their activation, and the Virgo android proved to be impossible to activate, in essence, being "still-born." Scorpio was so distraught over the loss of the Virgo LMD, he seemingly took his own life.

Because the first version of the Virgo LMD was "still-born," Scorpio created a new Virgo. During their battle with the Avengers, Virgo was able to incapacitate Iron Man, but had her face smashed into the ground by Tigra and was taken into custody along with the rest of The Zodiac LMD's that weren't destroyed during the battle. She arranged the ambush in which the android Zodiac killed all of the remaining human Zodiac leaders except Cornelius van Lunt, alias Taurus. Immediately afterward, Van Lunt sought out the services of the Avengers' West Coast branch to confront and defeat the android Zodiac. In their initial foray, the Avengers failed, although several androids were destroyed.

The Zodiac Key immediately resurrected the Scorpio LMD. Claiming superiority and believing that the Zodiac would eventually kill the Avengers as the androids could never be stopped, Scorpio wanted to use the Key to transport everyone on the scene to the Key's native dimension where the conflict, he believed, could be prolonged indefinitely. However, when the androids were in the other dimension, they ceased to function because each of them was aligned with a particular zodiacal energy, energy that did not exist in the other dimension. The Avengers found Hawkeye and Tigra had been sent to the same dimension and, reunited, the team was sent back to Earth by the Brotherhood. However, secretly the Brotherhood waited so that someday they could also send the Key to Earth again and create new conflicts for them.

Virgo (Ecliptic)

Ecliptic Virgo is one of the first recruits in the latest incarnation of the Zodiac. She was quiet and loyal to Scorpio, who was in love with her. She came to like Paris during her time stranded there without her teleportation device, but it is unknown if it was she or Taurus who killed her "rescuers." Virgo was apparently killed by Weapon X.

Thanos' Virgo
The fourth Virgo is an unnamed female who Thanos recruited to join his Zodiac. She and the other Zodiac members perish when Thanos abandons them on the self-destructing Helicarrier where Cancer was the only survivor.

Powers and abilities
The original Virgo was skilled in hand-to-hand combat.

The android Virgo employed an energy-siphoning device that she used on more than one occasion to shut down Iron Man's armor. Virgo was programmed after the Virgo sign. She was also particularly fond of money, seducing men, and relying upon proven tactics instead of taking risks.

Ecliptic's Virgo doesn't demonstrate any powers. She wields different guns and bows.

The fourth Virgo wears a special suit that transforms her into a winged female with a fiery head.

In other media
 Virgo appears in The Avengers: United They Stand as an alien with psychic powers and member of Zodiac.
 Virgo appears in the Marvel Anime: Iron Man episode "Daughter of the Zodiac" as a flying robotic head utilized by Zodiac. While fighting it, Iron Man discovers the machine is synchronized with the brainwaves of a telekinetic girl named Aki (voiced by Marina Inoue in the Japanese version and by Laura Bailey in the English dub) and breaks her free of Virgo's control before destroying it.

References

External links

Characters created by Roy Thomas
Characters created by Sal Buscema
Comics characters introduced in 1970
Fictional characters from Colorado
Marvel Comics supervillains